KGMS (940 AM) is a radio station broadcasting a Christian talk format, licensed to Tucson, Arizona, United States. The station is currently owned by Robert and Luann Wilkins, through licensee Tucson Christian Radio, Inc. The station operates with 1,000 watts daytime and 250 watts nighttime, using a two-tower directional antenna. Programming is simulcast by KNXN, 1470 AM in Sierra Vista, Arizona, in order to provide coverage southeast of Tucson.

History

KGMS originated from an application filed in 1958 for a new station on 940 kHz in Tucson, that prior to beginning operations was assigned the call letters KMBO in 1960, KOBY in 1961, and KHOS in 1963.

KHOS debuted in 1964 with a country music format. On September 1, 1977, it switched to Adult Contemporary and changed its call letters to KMGX. In July 1981, it switched to a Talk Radio format as KNST. The KNST call letters and format were moved to 790 AM in April 1993, which resulted in a call letter change to KWFM. The next year the call sign was changed to KCEE, and the station became KGMS in 2001.

Expanded Band assignment

On March 17, 1997, the Federal Communications Commission (FCC) announced that eighty-eight stations had been given permission to move to newly available "Expanded Band" transmitting frequencies, ranging from 1610 to 1700 kHz, with KCEE authorized to move from 940 kHz to 1630 kHz. However, the station never procured the Construction Permit needed to implement the authorization, so the expanded band station was never built.

References

External links
 
 FCC History Cards for KGMS (covering 1958-1981 as KMBO / KOBY / KHOS / KMGX / KNST)

GMS
Radio stations established in 1964
GMS
1964 establishments in Arizona